Sportclub Rist Wedel e.V., more commonly known as Rist Wedel, is a German basketball club based in Wedel. The men's team currently plays in the ProB, the third-tier national division. 

The women's team plays in the 2. Damen-Basketball-Bundesliga.

Honours
ProB
Runners-up (1): 2014–15

Season by season

Players

Notable players

 İsmet Akpınar
 Louis Olinde

References

External links
Official website (in German)

Basketball teams in Germany